The 2018 USAFL National Championships were the 22nd installment of the premier United States annual Australian rules football club tournament.

2018 USAFL National Championships club rankings

Men

Women

References

External links 

USAFL season
Australian rules football competitions
National championships in the United States